Scopula apparitaria  is a moth of the family Geometridae. It was described by Francis Walker in 1861. It is found in South and Central America, the Greater Antilles and Florida. The type location is Honduras.

References

Moths described in 1861
Moths of North America
Moths of South America
apparitaria